The Trial of Mary Dugan (Spanish:El proceso de Mary Dugan; French:Le procès de Mary Dugan) is a 1931 American drama film directed by Marcel De Sano and Gregorio Martínez Sierra and starring José Crespo, Adrienne D'Ambricourt and Juan de Landa.

It is based on Bayard Veiller's play The Trial of Mary Dugan. The film is a Spanish-language version of the 1929 hit The Trial of Mary Dugan. It was decided by Metro-Goldwyn-Mayer to remake the film for the Spanish market rather than subtitle or dub it as it contained long periods of static talking during the courtroom scenes. French and German versions were also made.

The film re-used the sets designed by Cedric Gibbons for the original 1929 film.

Cast
 José Crespo as Jimmy Dugan  
 Adrienne D'Ambricourt as Marie Ducrol  
 Juan de Landa as Insp. Hunt  
 María Fernanda Ladrón de Guevara as Mary Dugan 
 Delia Magaña as Dagmar Lorne  
 Celia Montalván as May Harris  
 Francisco Moreno as Secretario 
 Elvira Morla as Sra. Rice  
 Manuel París as Henry Plaisted  
 Ramón Pereda as Edward West  
 Rafael Rivelles as Fiscal  
 José Soriano Viosca as Juez  
 Romualdo Tirado as James Madison  
 Julio Villarreal as Dr. Welcome  
 Lucio Villegas as Cpt. Price

References

Bibliography
 Jarvinen, Lisa. The Rise of Spanish-language Filmmaking: Out from Hollywood's Shadow, 1929-1939. Rutger's University Press, 2012.

External links
 

1931 films
1931 drama films
1930s Spanish-language films
Spanish-language American films
American drama films
Remakes of American films
American multilingual films
American films based on plays
Metro-Goldwyn-Mayer films
American black-and-white films
1931 multilingual films
Films directed by Marcel De Sano
1930s American films